Cruise Hill is a hamlet outside Redditch, Worcestershire. It lies in between the villages of Feckenham, Callow Hill, Elcocks Brook & Ham Green.

Villages in Worcestershire
Redditch